The county of Buckinghamshire is divided into five districts. The districts of Buckinghamshire are South Bucks, Chiltern, Wycombe, Aylesbury Vale and Borough of Milton Keynes.

As there are 357 Grade II* listed buildings in the county they have been split into separate lists for each district.

 Grade II* listed buildings in South Bucks
 Grade II* listed buildings in Chiltern
 Grade II* listed buildings in Wycombe
 Grade II* listed buildings in Aylesbury Vale
 Grade II* listed buildings in the Borough of Milton Keynes

See also
 Grade I listed buildings in Buckinghamshire

References

 
Lists of Grade II* listed buildings in Buckinghamshire